Diana Gaspari (born 6 May 1984 in Innichen (San Candido)) is an Italian curler from Cortina d'Ampezzo. She currently coaches the Italian junior men's team.

Gaspari started playing curling in 1996. She plays in fourth position as a skip and is right-handed.

She made the playoffs at the 2017 European Curling Championships and won the bronze medal, against Switzerland 7–6.

Personal life
Gaspari works as an accountant.

References

External links

1984 births
Living people
Italian female curlers
Curlers at the 2006 Winter Olympics
Olympic curlers of Italy
People from Cortina d'Ampezzo
People from Innichen
Italian curling coaches
Competitors at the 2007 Winter Universiade
Sportspeople from Südtirol
Sportspeople from the Province of Belluno